is a Sōtō Zen monastery in Niihama, Ehime Prefecture in Japan.

See also
Buddhism in Japan
 For an explanation of terms concerning Japanese Buddhism, Japanese Buddhist art, and Japanese Buddhist temple architecture, see the Glossary of Japanese Buddhism.

References
 "Shingon-shu Temple Zuioji." Shingon-shu Temple Zuioji. N.p., 2014. Web. 19 Feb. 2016. <http://www.zuiojitemple.or.jp/e_index.html>.

Soto temples
Buddhist temples in Ehime Prefecture